Lee Seung-Jun (born Eric Lee Sandrin; 18 May 1978) is an American-born South Korean professional basketball player. He last played for Alab Pilipinas of the ASEAN Basketball League.

Career
Lee's basketball career took him around the world, including two years in Luxembourg and one in Brazil. He later returned to the United States, and was playing for the Bellingham Slam in 2005 when he caught the attention of scouts for the Harlem Globetrotters, and signed for a season with them. On the team, he acquired the nickname "Shanghai". That year, he also played for the Los Angeles Lakers in the NBA Summer League and the Sacramento Kings in the NBA preseason. He went on to play for the Singapore Slingers, where he was noted for a September 2008 incident in which his trash-talking provoked members of the opposing Air21 Express team to violence; Ranidel de Ocampo deliberately walked under him during a dunk to cause him to lose his balance and fall over, while Homer Se later kicked him in the head and was ejected from the game. He played for South Korea at the 2010 Asian Games and the 2013 FIBA Asia Championship.

In mid-November 2016, Alab Pilipinas of the ASEAN Basketball League announced that they have signed Lee.

Personal life
Lee grew up in the Pacific Northwest. His mother is Korean. His younger brother Daniel Sandrin also plays in the Korean Basketball League, for the Seoul Samsung Thunders under the name Lee Dong-Jun. He became a South Korean citizen in 2009, relinquishing his United States citizenship in the process. Lee is fluent in both Korean and English.

See also
List of former United States citizens who relinquished their nationality

References

External links
 Profile at KBL.or.kr

1978 births
Living people
American emigrants to South Korea
San Miguel Alab Pilipinas players
Asian Games medalists in basketball
Asian Games silver medalists for South Korea
ABA All-Star Game players
Basketball players at the 2010 Asian Games
Basketball players from Washington (state)
Korean Basketball League players
Medalists at the 2010 Asian Games
People with acquired South Korean citizenship
People from Shoreline, Washington
Former United States citizens
Portland Pilots men's basketball players
Power forwards (basketball)
Seattle Pacific Falcons men's basketball players
Seoul Samsung Thunders players
South Korean expatriate sportspeople in the Philippines
South Korean men's basketball players
South Korean people of American descent
Wonju DB Promy players